Smallbone Park is a cricket ground in Rotorua, Bay of Plenty, New Zealand.  The first recorded match held on the ground came in 1938 when Bay of Plenty played Waiapu.

The ground held its first first-class match during the 1968/69 Plunket Shield when Northern Districts played Otago.  Between the 1968/69 and 1995/96 seasons, seventeen first-class matches were held there, the last of which saw Northern Districts play Central Districts in the 1995/96 Shell Trophy.  The first List A match held there came when Northern Districts played Auckland in the 1984/85 Shell Cup.  Northern Districts played six further List A matches at the ground, the last of which came in the 2002/03 State Shield against Otago.

A single Women's One Day International was played there on 25 February 1995, when Australia Women played India Women in the New Zealand Women's Centenary Tournament.

References

External links
Smallbone Park at ESPNcricinfo
Smallbone Park at CricketArchive

Cricket grounds in New Zealand
Sports venues in the Bay of Plenty Region